Prince Manucher Mirza (1917–2003) was born in Tehran in 1917. He was the sixth son of Prince Abdol-Hossein Farman Farma and of Batoul Khanoum.

He studied petroleum engineering at Birmingham University in England before returning to Iran. On his return he joined the military rising to the rank of second lieutenant and left in the weeks surrounding January 1943.

He went on to work in the Ministry of Finance until he was appointed to become the director general of Petroleum, Concessions, and Mines in April 1949.

In 1958, he became the director of sales for the National Iranian Oil Company. A key signatory in the 1959 Cairo Agreement that resulted in OPEC, he was Iran's first ambassador to Venezuela. In 1979, during the Iranian Revolution, Manucher escaped across the Iran-Turkey border with the help of Kurdish smugglers. After fleeing from Ayatollah Khomeini's regime in the 1979, revolution, Manucher Mirza permanently relocated to Venezuela, establishing a new life and a new business (potato crisp manufacturer) for himself. In his later life he co-authored Blood and Oil: Memoirs of a Persian Prince with his daughter Roxane Farman Farmaian, which was published in 1997.

In 2003, Manucher died in Caracas and was buried in Oakland Cemetery in Sag Harbor, New York next to his brother Abol-Bashar Mirza Farman Farmaian.

Publications
Travels to Persia 
Considerations of the Problems of Oil
Blood and Oil: Memoirs of a Persian Prince, Random House, New York, 1997.

Government positions held
Director of Sales for the National Iranian Oil Company
Ambassador to Venezuela

See also
Persia (Iran)
 History of Iran (Persia)
Qajar dynasty of Iran (Persia)
Iran-Venezuela relations

Sources
Blood and Oil: Memoirs of a Persian Prince; Manucher Mirza Farman Farmaian. Random House, New York, 1997.

Notes

External links
The Qajar (Kadjar) Pages

1917 births
2003 deaths
Qajar princes
20th-century Iranian engineers
20th-century Iranian businesspeople
Businesspeople from Tehran
Ambassadors of Iran to Venezuela
Alumni of the University of Birmingham
Iranian emigrants to Venezuela
Farmanfarmaian family
Iranian expatriates in the United Kingdom